Ben Alder is the highest mountain in the remote area of the Scottish Highlands between Loch Ericht and Glen Spean. The vast summit plateau is home of one of Britain's highest bodies of standing water, Lochan a' Garbh Coire.

Climbing
Sitting 19 km from Dalwhinnie and 15 km from Corrour railway station, it is commonly climbed in a two-day expedition, usually taking in its lower neighbour, Beinn Bheoil. There are two bothies near the mountain: Culra Lodge (closed due to asbestos contamination) to the northeast and Ben Alder Cottage to the south, both potentially providing shelter for walkers in the area. Ben Alder Cottage is reputed to be haunted by the ghost of a ghillie who hanged himself from the rafters.

The "Man with no Name" 

A man's body was found near the top of Ben Alder in June 1996, at the edge of a cliff face, overlooking a lochan, his heart pierced by an old-fashioned lead ball bullet. All the labels had been cut from his clothing. Forms of identification such as credit cards were missing. He had a replica Remington .44, unsuitable slip-on shoes, three 1.5-litre bottles of water in his rucksack and £21 in cash.

Although the police later ascertained that his clothing came mostly from French supermarkets, it was not until November 1997, following a cranio-facial reconstruction of the dead man's face, that a friend of the family wondered if the man might be Emmanuel Caillet, from south Paris, France.  Last seen by his parents on 14 August 1995, it was established that Emmanuel had crossed the Channel the next day.  He then sold his car for £350, less than its value.  Two days later he stayed one night in the Stakis-Ingram Hotel, Glasgow, paying with his Visa card. His identity was duly confirmed.

There were suggestions he might have been murdered because a witness claimed that he had been with another man at Corrour railway station, but forensic evidence points to suicide.

Kidnapped 

Ben Alder is one of the locations featured in the novel Kidnapped by Robert Louis Stevenson. The main characters David Balfour and Alan Breck Stewart are hosted by the Scottish clan chief Cluny Macpherson, fugitive after the Second Jacobite Rising, in one of his hiding places at Ben Alder.

The part about Cluny MacPherson is based on a true story. He really did hide out for an astonishing nine years on the slopes of Ben Alder, in a hiding place called 'the Cage', before escaping to France. Prince Charles Edward Stuart briefly joined him there in early September 1746 whilst on the run after the failure of the Forty-Five.

Geodesy
Ben Alder was the origin (meridian) of the 6 inch and 1:2500 Ordnance Survey maps of Inverness-shire.

See also 
 List of Munro mountains
 Mountains and hills of Scotland

References

 Mentions ghost of Ben Alder Cottage

Munros
Marilyns of Scotland
Mountains and hills of the Central Highlands
Mountains and hills of Highland (council area)
One-thousanders of Scotland